Kadetten Schaffhausen is a Swiss handball team located in Schaffhausen. Their home matches are played at the BBC Arena which has a capacity of 3,500.
They compete in the Swiss First League of Handball and won the championship 12 times (2005, 2006, 2007, 2010, 2011, 2012, 2014, 2015, 2016, 2017, 2019, 2022). In 2010 they reached the EHF Cup final but lost to the German team TBV Lemgo.

Kits

Sports Hall information

Arena: - BBC Arena 
City: - Schaffhausen 
Capacity: - 3500
Address: - Schweizersbildstrasse 10, 8207 Schaffhausen

European record

Team

Current squad
Squad for the 2022–23 season

Goalkeepers
1  Kristian Pilipović
 22  Martin Ziemer
Left Wingers
 15  Marvin Lier
 17  Jost Brücker
Right Wingers
6  Óðinn Þór Ríkharðsson
 24  Nik Tominec
Pivot
3  Igor Žabić
9  Jonas Schopper
 26  Lukas Herburger

Left Backs
7  Joan Cañellas
 19  Zoran Marković
 20  Luka Maros
Central Backs
5  Torben Matzken
 25  Sandro Obranović
Right Backs
2  Robin Heinis
 10  Donát Bartók
 13  Michael Kusio

Transfers
Transfers for the 2023–24 season

 Joining
  Julien Meyer (GK) (from  C' Chartres MHB)
  Ariel Pietrasik (LB) (from  TSV St. Otmar St. Gallen)

 Leaving 
  Martin Ziemer (GK) (to ?)
  Donát Bartók (RB) (to  Balatonfüredi KSE)
  Nik Tominec (RW) (retires)

Notable former players

 Lukas Herburger
 Christian Dissinger
 Björgvin Páll Gústavsson
 Gábor Császár
 Mait Patrail
 Petr Hrachovec
 Jan Filip
 Ljubomir Pavlović
  Uroš Elezović
    Nenad Puljezević
 Aleksandar Stojanović (handballer)
 Bojan Beljanski (2018-2020)
  Arūnas Vaškevičius
 Dragan Jerković
 Marius Aleksejev
  Dušan Podpečan
 Leszek Starczan
 Michał Szyba
 Rareş Jurcă
 Peter Kukučka
 Krešimir Maraković
 Marko Mamić
  Savas Karipidis
 Stian Vatne
 Matthias Rauh
  Elio Bucher
 Severin Brüngger
  Florian Göpfert
  Christian Meisterhans
 Nikola Portner
  Iwan Ursić
  Nikola Cvijetić

References

External links
 
 

Swiss handball clubs
Canton of Schaffhausen
Schaffhausen